Abdishakur Mohamoud Hassan Iddin is a Somaliland politician who is the current Mayor of Berbera, Somaliland. Iddin belongs to the Issa Musa sub-division of the Habr Awal Isaaq clan.

See also

Mayor of Berbera
Mayor of Hargeisa

References

Issa Musa
Peace, Unity, and Development Party politicians
Mayors of places in Somaliland
People from Maroodi Jeex
Year of birth missing (living people)
Living people